Orthotylus schoberiae is a species of bug from the Miridae family that can be found in Austria, Bulgaria, Croatia, Germany, Italy, Moldova, Romania, Slovakia, Spain, Ukraine, and northwest Russia.

References

Insects described in 1876
Hemiptera of Europe
schoberiae